The NC State Wolfpack women's soccer team represent North Carolina State University in the Atlantic Coast Conference (ACC) of NCAA Division I women's college soccer. The team has never won the ACC regular season championship, but has won the ACC Tournament once. The team has advanced to the NCAA Women's soccer tournament 14 times.  The most notable of these appearances was in 1988, when the Wolfpack finished runners up.

History

1980s
The Wolfpack women's soccer program was founded in 1984 under head coach Larry Gross.  The team enjoyed a successful first season, only losing one game, to finish 11–1–4.  The next year they finished with the same win total, and qualified for the program's first NCAA Tournament.  1986, saw the Wolfpack improve to 16 wins, and again qualify for the NCAA Tournament.  In 1987, the team joined the Atlantic Coast Conference.  1988 was the Wolfpack's best year in their history.  The team finished with a 19–2–3 record, won the ACC Tournament and finished runner up in the NCAA tournament.  The decade would close on a high note as the team again enjoyed success.  They finished runner up in the ACC tournament, and advanced to the semifinals of the NCAA tournament.

1990s
The Wolfpack's success continued into the 1990s, with the team continuing to win double digit games, and qualify for the NCAA Tournament. The team won a program second-best 18 games in 1991, and finished runner up in the ACC tournament that year.  However, win totals started to decline, as the team won 10 games in 1993, a then program low.  1993 also marked the first year since the team was founded, that the Wolfpack did not qualify for the NCAA Tournament.  Prior to the 1994 season, head coach Larry Gross resigned, citing the desire to spend more time with his family. Alvin Corneal was hired as a replacement.  His first season in charge resulted in a semifinal in the ACC tournament and a trip to the second round in the NCAA Tournament.  This was improved upon in 1995, when the Wolfpack tied a program record with 19 wins, and made the Quarterfinals of the NCAA tournament.  However, the team's record fell off, winning only 11 games in 1996 and 9 games in 1997.  1997 was the first time the Wolfpack had a losing season in their history.  Corneal would not continue as head coach after that season.  In December 1997, Laura Kerrigan was hired as the third head coach in program history. Kerrigan's first two seasons were difficult.  The team won only 7 games in 1998 and 1999.  Both seasons were a program low at the time.

2000s
The beginning of the decade saw a string of mediocre seasons.  2000-2003 all saw the Wolfpack finish between 8 and 10 wins and 7 and 10 losses.  The team made the ACC tournament in all of those years, but never qualified for the NCAA tournament.  2004 started a slide for the team.  The Wolfpack finished 7–8–3 and would not have another winning season until 2011.  2005 was the first year since the ACC tournament began that NC State did not qualify for the tournament.  2006 proved a blip on the radar when the team finished 9–9–2 and qualified for the ACC tournament.  This would be the last ACC tournament the team would qualify for until 2016.  After a 2007 and 2008 season which saw the Wolfpack go a combined 0–19–1 in ACC play Kerrigan stepped down as head coach.  Shortly thereafter, in January 2009, Steve Springthorpe was named the fourth head coach in the program's history.  In his first season, 2009, the team finished 8–9–2 and notched their first ACC wins in 2 years, finishing 2–7–1 in ACC play.

2010s
Springthorpe's tenure endured a tough 2010, with the Wolfpack finishing 7–12–0 overall and 1–9–0 in ACC play.  2011 was the team's first winning season since 2002, but the success was not matched in ACC play, where the team finished 1–7–2.  2012 saw a fall in performance when the Wolfpack finished 5–14–0 overall and 0–10–0 in ACC play.  In October 2012, Springthorpe resigned to pursue other professional opportunities.  One month later, in November 2012, Tim Santoro was announced as the new head coach.  Santoro's first season, 2013, came with a 7–12 record and 2 ACC wins.  However, these would prove to be the team's only ACC wins in a four-year span.  The Wolfpack lost 15 games in both 2014 and 2015, and did not win an ACC game in either year.  2016 saw a drastic improvement.  The Wolfpack finished 11–9–2, qualified for the ACC Tournament, and qualified for the NCAA Tournament.  This was their first ACC Tournament since 2006, and first NCAA Tournament since 1996.  The team reached the quarterfinals of the NCAA tournament, a first in 21 years.  2017 saw similar success with the team winning 15 games, reaching the semifinals of the ACC Tournament and the second round of the NCAA Tournament.  In 2018, the team did not qualify for the ACC Tournament, but reached the Round of 16 in the NCAA Tournament.

2020s 
The decade started with a season effected by the COVID-19 pandemic.  The Wolfpack decided to opt out of the season due to concerns surrounding the pandemic. However, the Wolfpack returned for the spring season and finished 5–3–1 but were not invited to the NCAA Tournament.  The non-invite snapped a four-year streak of being invited to the tournament.  2021 saw a return to a more normal schedule where the Wolfpack posted a 9–9–2 overall record and went 4–6–0 in ACC play.  They returned to the NCAA Tournament four the fifth time in six years.  In 2022, the Wolfpack finished 7–7–6 overall and 2–6–2 in ACC play.  Their seven overall wins and 2 ACC wins were the worst in a full season since 2015.  However, they received an invitation NCAA Tournament, extending their streak to six out of seven years and six straight full seasons of play.

Personnel

Current roster

Team management

Source:

Seasons

†In 1987, the Wolfpack began play in the Atlantic Coast Conference.

Notable alumni

Current Professional Players
 Linda Hamilton (1987–1989) – Currently Head Coach at Southwestern University
 Jessica O'Rourke (2004–2007) – Currently with Fenerbahçe
 Taylor Porter (2015–2018) – Currently with Portland Thorns
 Tziarra King (2016–2019) – Currently with OL Reign
 Ricarda Walkling (2016–2019) – Currently with Werder Bremen
 Antonie Stárová (2019–2022) – Currently with Sparta Prague

References

External links
 
 2018 Media Guide

 
Soccer clubs in North Carolina
NCAA Division I women's soccer teams